was a private junior women's college in Hiroshima, Hiroshima Prefecture, Japan, established in 1950.

Merger
On March 28, 2013, Suzugamine Gakuen (the corporation that runs Suzugamine Women's College) and Shudo Gakuen (which runs Hiroshima Shudo University) announced that they would merge due to the increased competition for new students (resulting from Japan's declining birth rate). They joined forces to provide improved education services to better benefit the region, while maintaining their individual traditions and strengths. The merger was to be completed on April 1, 2015.

The college's traditions and education were passed to Hiroshima Shudo University. Issuance of certificates will be held at the Hiroshima Shudo University Faculty Center.

Suzumi Women's Junior College closed after 67.5 years at the end of March 2017.

References

External links
 Official website  

Educational institutions established in 1950
Private universities and colleges in Japan
Universities and colleges in Hiroshima Prefecture
Women's universities and colleges in Japan
1950 establishments in Japan
Japanese junior colleges